The 1999 WNBA season was the third season for the Houston Comets. The Comets won their third WNBA Finals.

WNBA Draft

Regular season

Season standings

Season Schedule

Playoffs
Led by what was already known as the Big Three, (Sheryl Swoopes, Cynthia Cooper and Tina Thompson), the Comets survived a highlight film last second, court to court game winning shot by the Liberty's Teresa Weatherspoon in Game 2 of the finals to beat the Liberty in three games and win their third straight title, this one after the death of teammate Kim Perrot, who died of cancer.

Won WNBA Western Conference Finals (2-0) over Los Angeles Sparks
Won WNBA Finals (2-1) over New York Liberty

Awards and honors
 Cynthia Cooper, WNBA Finals MVP Award
Cynthia Cooper, Best WNBA Player ESPY Award
Cynthia Cooper, Guard, Houston Comets, All-WNBA First Team
 Van Chancellor, WNBA Coach of the Year Award
Sheryl Swoopes, Forward, Houston Comets, All-WNBA First Team
Tina Thompson, Forward, Houston Comets, All-WNBA Second Team

References

External links 
 Comets on Basketball Reference
 

Houston Comets seasons
Houston
Houston
Women's National Basketball Association championship seasons
Western Conference (WNBA) championship seasons